Myosin light chain kinase 3 also known as MYLK3, is an enzyme which in humans is encoded by the MYLK3 gene.

Function 

Phosphorylation of cardiac myosin heavy chains (see MYH7B) and light chains (see MYL2) by a kinase, such as MYLK3, potentiates the force and rate of cross-bridge recruitment in cardiac myocytes.

See also 
 Myosin light-chain kinase

References

Further reading

EC 2.7.11